Ghulam Mustafa Mir was an Indian Politician and a member of the Jammu and Kashmir Legislative Assembly. He served twice as Member of the Legislative Assembly from Chadoora (Vidhan Sabha constituency) first in 1972 from the Indian National Congress and then in 1987 as an Independent Politician. Mir was abducted and assassinated by militants in March 1990.

Political career 
Mir joined the Indian National Congress in 1960 and fought elections from the party in 1972 in which he achieved victory with an impressive lead of 18961 votes and 20774 margin in total. He was considered a close ally but he left congress and later fought the 1987 assembly elections as an independent candidate where he again emerged as victorious.

Assassination 
In March 1990, Mir left his house but on his way he was abducted by militants, who demanded the release of eight militants but negotiations did not go well and he was killed, two days later, his body was found near Batamaloo and the accused gunmen were later killed in an encounter.

References 

1990 deaths
Assassinated Indian politicians
Politicians from Srinagar
Jammu and Kashmir MLAs 1972–1977
Jammu and Kashmir MLAs 1987–1996